Barrelville is an unincorporated community in Charleston County, in the U.S. state of South Carolina.

History
Barrelville originally was built up at the site of a barrel factory, and was named for its chief industry.

References

Unincorporated communities in South Carolina
Unincorporated communities in Charleston County, South Carolina